Marie-Anne Detourbay (18 January 1837 – 21 January 1908) was a French demimonde and salon-holder. She was a famous courtesan during the Second Empire, and also hosted a literary salon which had some influence during the Second Empire and the Third Republic. She is also known for her relationship with Jules Lemaître.

Biography 
Marie-Anne Detourbay, was born in rue Gambetta, Reims to a poor and large family. Her mother was a cloth burler and her father unknown. From age eight she was employed to rinse champagne bottles. She moved to Paris when she was 15, where under the name of Jeanne de Tourbey she was discovered in a brothel by Alexandre Dumas fils. She soon became part of the Parisian demimonde.

Her first protector, Marc Fournier, was director of the Théâtre de la Porte Saint-Martin, who introduced her to Prince Napoleon, cousin of Napoleon III. Napoleon installed her in a beautiful flat in rue de l'Arcade, close to the Avenue des Champs-Élysées. She would host an exclusively male assembly of the Parisian men of letters: Ernest Renan, Sainte-Beuve, Théophile Gautier, Prévost-Paradol and Emile de Girardin.

Through her best friend, actress Josephine Clemence Ennery, nicknamed "Gisette"(fr), she met Gustave Flaubert and Khalil-Bey, who fell in love with her. From Tunis, where he went to write Salammbô, Flaubert wrote: 

Around 1862, she met Ernest Baroche fr, son of senior Ministerial Civil Servant Jules Baroche fell in love with her. Ernest himself had been made another Minister of Napoleon III, Master of Petitions at the State Council and Director of Foreign Trade at the Ministry of Agriculture. They would have become engaged but, as Commander of the 12th mobile battalion of the Seine, he was killed in action at the Battle of Le Bourget on 30 October 1870 and left her a fortune of 800,000 gold francs (about 2.5 million Euros) and a sugar factory. The director of the factory was retired officer Count Victor Edgar de Loynes.

In 1872, she married de Loynes,. This marriage gave her access to high society, but the Count soon left for America, where he disappeared. Although the marriage was only nominal, because her husband's family had opposed their union, she carried and kept the use of the name and title of Countess de Loynes. Her visitors became more prestigious; received every day between five and seven o'clock. The celebrities of the Second Empire give way to those of the nascent Third Republic, a new regime which the Countess de Loynes did not like. Her visitors included Georges Clemenceau, Georges de Porto-Riche, Alexandre Dumas fils, Ernest Daudet, Henry Houssaye, Pierre Decourcelle, and soon many young writers and musicians led by Maurice Barrès, who gave her his two books Huit jours chez M. Renan (1890) and Du sang, de la volupté, et de la mort (1894) luxuriously bound by Charles Meunier in 1897. Others included Paul Bourget, Marcel Proust, Georges Bizet and Henri Kowalski.

Between 1880 and 1885, through Arsène Houssaye, she met the critic Jules Lemaître, who was 15 years younger than her. Under his leadership, she founded, the League of the French Homeland in 1899, and became its first president. Encouraging nationalism, they put their political hopes, like other personalities such as the Duchess of Uzès, in General Boulanger and became passionately anti-Dreyfusards. This led to a break with some of her friends including Georges Clemenceau, Georges de Porto-Riche and Anatole France. From then on she received into her home Édouard Drumont, Jules Guérin and Henri Rochefort.

In her latter years she supported the political position of Charles Maurras, and shortly before her death on 21 January 1908, Detourbay helped Maurras and Léon Daudet to found the Royalist newspaper L'Action française by donating 100,000 gold francs.

The Countess of Loynes was buried in Montmartre Cemetery, alongside her parents.

Residences

Reims
 58, rue neuve, (now rue Gambetta), from her birth in 1837
 16, rue du Cadran-Saint-Pierre (in 1852);
 8, rue de la Grosse-Écritoire (in 1854, middle-class pension).

Paris
 Place Royale (Place des Vosges);
 Rue de Vendôme (in 1857);
 28, rue de l'Arcade (8th arrondissement) (in 1865);
 53, avenue d'Iéna (in 1886);
 152, avenue des Champs-Elysées (8th arrondissement) (from 1896).

References

Bibliography

External links 
 Généalogie
 La tombe de la comtesse de Loynes.

1837 births
1908 deaths
People from Reims
French salon-holders
French courtesans
Burials at Montmartre Cemetery